The 1985 Pro Bowl was the NFL's 35th annual all-star game which featured the outstanding performers from the 1984 season. The game was played on Sunday, January 27, 1985, at Aloha Stadium in Honolulu, Hawaii before a crowd of 50,385. The final score was AFC 22, NFC 14.

Chuck Noll of the Pittsburgh Steelers led the AFC team against an NFC team coached by Chicago Bears head coach Mike Ditka. The referee was Chuck Heberling.

Mark Gastineau of the New York Jets was named the game's Most Valuable Player. Players on the winning AFC team received $10,000 apiece while the NFC participants each took home $5,000.

AFC roster

Offense

Defense

Special teams

NFC roster

Offense

Defense

Special teams

References

External links

Pro Bowl
Pro Bowl
Pro Bowl
Pro Bowl
Pro Bowl
American football competitions in Honolulu
January 1985 sports events in the United States